The Philippine House Special Committee on Senior Citizens is a special committee of the Philippine House of Representatives.

Jurisdiction 
As prescribed by House Rules, the committee's jurisdiction is on the needs and welfare of senior citizens as well as policies and programs that will enhance their active participation in society.

Members, 18th Congress

Historical members

18th Congress

Chairperson 
 Francisco Datol Jr. (SENIOR CITIZENS)

Member for the Majority 
 Nestor Fongwan (Benguet–Lone, PDP–Laban)

See also 
 House of Representatives of the Philippines
 List of Philippine House of Representatives committees

Notes

References

External links 
House of Representatives of the Philippines

Senior Citizens